Viburnum nudum is a deciduous shrub in the genus Viburnum within the muskroot family, Adoxaceae (It was formerly part of Caprifoliaceae, the honeysuckle family).

One variety of the species is Viburnum nudum var. cassinoides; synonyms for this variety Viburnum nitidum Aiton, Viburnum cassinoides, Viburnum cassinoides var. harbisonii, Viburnum cassinoides var. nitidum, and Viburnum nitidum.

Common names for the plant include -rod, witherod viburnum, possumhaw, and wild raisin.

Description
Viburnum nudum is a shrub with opposite, simple leaves, on slender stems. The flowers are white, borne in late spring.

Range
It is native to North America from southern Ontario and Quebec to Newfoundland, south to Florida, and west to Wisconsin.

Ecology
The fruit is eaten by wildlife, and deer browse the foliage.  It is a larval host to spring azures and hummingbird clearwing moths.

Conservation status in the United States
It is listed as endangered in Kentucky and Pennsylvania and as special concern species and believed extirpated in Connecticut.

Native American ethnobotany

Cuisine
The Abenaki use the fruit and the grains of var. cassinoides  for food. The Algonquin people eat the berries of var. cassinoides.

Medicinal use
The Cherokee have several medicinal uses for Viburnum nudum var. cassinoides. They take an infusion of it to prevent recurrent spasms, use the root bark  as a diaphoretic and a tonic, and take a compound infusion of it  for fever, smallpox and ague. They also use an infusion of the bark as a wash for a sore tongue.

References

nudum
Flora of the Eastern United States
Plants described in 1753
Plants used in Native American cuisine
Plants used in traditional Native American medicine
Taxa named by Carl Linnaeus